Hilbert's sixth problem is to axiomatize those branches of physics in which mathematics is prevalent. It occurs on the widely cited list of Hilbert's problems in mathematics that he presented in the year 1900. In its common English translation, the explicit statement reads:

6. Mathematical Treatment of the Axioms of Physics. The investigations on the foundations of geometry suggest the problem: To treat in the same manner, by means of axioms, those physical sciences in which already today mathematics plays an important part; in the first rank are the theory of probabilities and mechanics.

Hilbert gave the further explanation of this problem and its possible specific forms:

"As to the axioms of the theory of probabilities, it seems to me desirable that their logical investigation should be accompanied by a rigorous and satisfactory development of the method of mean values in mathematical physics, and in particular in the kinetic theory of gases. ... Boltzmann's work on the principles of mechanics suggests the problem of developing mathematically the limiting processes, there merely indicated, which lead from the atomistic view to the laws of motion of continua."

History
David Hilbert himself devoted much of his research to the sixth problem;  in particular, he worked in those fields of physics that arose after he stated the problem.

In the 1910s, celestial mechanics evolved into general relativity. Hilbert and Emmy Noether  corresponded extensively with Albert Einstein on the formulation of the theory.

In the 1920s, mechanics of microscopic systems evolved into quantum mechanics. Hilbert, with the assistance of John von Neumann, L. Nordheim, and E. P. Wigner, worked on the axiomatic basis of quantum mechanics (see Hilbert space).  At the same time, but independently, Dirac formulated quantum mechanics in a way that is close to an axiomatic system, as did Hermann Weyl with the assistance of Erwin Schrödinger.

In the 1930s, probability theory was put on an axiomatic basis by Andrey Kolmogorov, using measure theory.

Since the 1960s, following the work of Arthur Wightman and Rudolf Haag, modern quantum field theory can also be considered close to an axiomatic description.

In the 1990s-2000s the problem of "the limiting processes, there merely indicated, which lead from the atomistic view to the laws of motion of continua" was approached by many groups of mathematicians. Main recent results are summarized by Laure Saint-Raymond, Marshall Slemrod, Alexander N. Gorban and Ilya Karlin.

Status
Hilbert’s sixth problem was a proposal to expand the axiomatic method outside the existing mathematical disciplines, to physics and beyond. This expansion requires development of semantics of physics with formal analysis of the notion of physical reality that should be done. Two fundamental theories capture the majority of the fundamental phenomena of physics:
 Quantum field theory, which provides the mathematical framework for the Standard Model;
 General relativity, which describes space-time and gravity at macroscopic scale.
Hilbert considered general relativity as an essential part of the foundation of physics. However, quantum field theory is not logically consistent with general relativity, indicating the need for a still-unknown theory of quantum gravity, where the semantics of physics is expected to play a central role. Hilbert's sixth problem thus remains open.

See also
Wightman axioms
Constructive quantum field theory

Notes

References

External links
 David Hilbert, Mathematical Problems, Problem 6, in English translation.

06
Unsolved problems in physics